Slamdance may refer to:
 Moshing, a form of dance associated with punk rock and other musical genres
 Slamdance Film Festival, an annual event in Park City, Utah featuring the work of independent filmmakers
 Slamdance (Transformers), a fictional character in the Transformers universe